Mifflin-Marim Agricultural Complex is a historic home located at Dover, Kent County, Delaware. The complex consists of four contributing buildings and two contributing structures. The main house dates to about 1820, and is a two-story, five bay, center hall plan brick dwelling.  The "L"-shaped dwelling has a low two-story rear wing. The house and its associated agricultural outbuildings are reflective of 18th century building techniques.  They are a barn, stable, frame corn crib and granary on brick piers and a series of small sheds and utility buildings.

It was added to the National Register of Historic Places in 1984.

References

Houses on the National Register of Historic Places in Delaware
Houses completed in 1820
Houses in Dover, Delaware
National Register of Historic Places in Dover, Delaware